St. Louis Motor Carriage Company was a manufacturer of automobiles at 1211–13 North Vandeventer Avenue in St. Louis, Missouri, founded by George Preston Dorris (later credited with developing and patenting the float-carburetor) and John L. French in 1898, with French taking charge of marketing and Dorris heading engineering and production. St. Louis Motor Carriage was the first of many St. Louis automakers and produced automobiles from 1899 to 1907.

History
George Dorris was an automotive pioneer who built his first experimental car in 1895 in Nashville.  John French also from Nashville, involved his family and Jesse French, Sr. put up most of the money needed to form St. Louis Motor Carriage Company.  A new purpose built factory was built in St. Louis.

St. Louis, Missouri 
The first St. Louis models had single and twin-cylinder engines, chain drive and a steering lever for steering.  In 1901 there were five models to choose from; single-cylinder models from 7hp to 10hp and two-cylinder models from 15hp to 25hp.  Prices started at $1,000, . 

In 1900, John French drove a St. Louis on the first automobile trip between St. Louis and Chicago.  In 1901 he was one of only three drivers to finish in a New York-to-Buffalo race.

In 1902 a steering wheel was introduced. A new model was a 35hp four-cylinder engine touring car was available for one year only. The single and twin-cylinder engines remained in production.  By 1904 there were two models with single-cylinder engines, the runabout and tonneau . A 24hp three-cylinder engine was introduced with a tonneau body.

In 1905 the cars consisted of a choice of a 12hp with a single-cylinder engine, 16hp with a two-cylinder engine or 20/24hp with a three-cylinder engine. All models had an 86-inch wheelbase with a side-entrance tonneau body.

Peoria, Illinois 
The St. Louis Motor Carriage Company moved to Peoria, Illinois in 1905 and became the St. Louis Motor Car Company.  A new three-story factory on 10 acres was constructed.  George Dorris started his own car company, the Dorris Motor Car Company, in the former St. Louis Motor Carriage plant in 1906  Dorris motor cars were in production until 1926.

From 1906 all St. Louis cars had a four-cylinder engine with a drive-shaft. The models received Roman numerals as designations. The Type XV had an engine rated at 30/34hp and a wheelbase of 104-inches. The Type XVI had a more powerful 32/36hp engine on a longer 108-inch wheelbase. Both were touring cars with five seats.

In 1907 there were three models to choose from; Type XVII had a 35hp engine and was designed as a two-seater runabout. The Type XVIII  was identical except for being a five-seat touring car.  The Type XIX had an engine with 45/50 hp and a wheelbase of 112-inches. It was available as a touring car with five or seven seats.  From 1906 all cars were priced in the $2,000 range with the Tye XIX priced at $3,000, .

With the cost of the expansion, in July 1907, Jesse French, Jr. reported the company was financially in trouble.  In August, St. Louis Motor Car Company was in Receivership and the Panic of 1907 dried up any rescue financing.  By December, the factory was sold for $10,000.

Gallery

See also
 Dorris Motors Corporation

External links 
 1904 St. Louis at ConceptCarz
 1904 St. Louis at National Park Service
 The Best of the Little Three - Saint Louis Runabout - Hemmings article

References

Defunct motor vehicle manufacturers of the United States
Manufacturing companies based in St. Louis
Motor vehicle manufacturers based in Illinois
Veteran vehicles
Brass Era vehicles
1890s cars
1900s cars
Cars introduced in 1898
Vehicle manufacturing companies established in 1898
Vehicle manufacturing companies disestablished in 1907